Saadatabad (also Romanized as Sa‘ādatābād; also known as Sa‘adat Abad Sarvestan) is a village in Kuhenjan Rural District, Kuhenjan District, Sarvestan County, Fars Province, Iran. At the 2006 census, its population was 242, in 64 families.

References 

Populated places in Sarvestan County